Whatever, Mortal is the second album by Papa M, the third such pseudonym used by David Pajo (after 'M' and 'Aerial M'), released in 2001 on the Chicago-based Drag City label (see 2001 in music).

Track listing
 "Over Jordan" - 4:20
 "Beloved Woman" – 3:26
 "Roses in the Snow" – 3:45
 "Sorrow Reigns" – 1:18
 "Krusty" – 3:54
 "The Lass of Roch Royal" – 2:53
 "Many Splendored Thing" – 3:53
 "Glad You're Here With Me" – 3:23
 "Tamu" – 3:18
 "Sabotage" – 7:16
 "Purple Eyelid" – 3:06
 "The Unquiet Grave" - 5:13
 "The Northwest Passage" - 5:44

Personnel
David Pajo - electric and acoustic guitar, piano, melodica, bass, drums, keyboards, vocals, backing vocals, banjo, sitar, harmonica, percussion
Will Oldham - bass, piano, electric guitar, backing vocals
Tara Jane O'Neil - banjo, acoustic guitar
with:
Britt Walford - drums on "Beloved Woman"
Technical
David Pajo - engineer, recording
Mary Newton - front cover painting

References

External links
Drag City label
David Pajo's official website

David Pajo albums
2001 albums
Drag City (record label) albums